National Rahmatul-lil-Alameen Wa Khatam an-Nabiyyin Authority is  an ideological institution of the Government of Pakistan. Set up under the Federal Ministry of Education & Professional Training  by the former Prime Minister Imran Khan in October 2021,  the first Chairman was Ijaz Akram. The ordinance to set up the authority was promulgated by President Arif Alvi on 13 October 2021. In July 2022, JUI-F former MNA Shahida Akhtar Ali suggest the new name of the authority by adding Khatam an-Nabiyyin, which was endorsed by President of Pakistan, Arif Alvi per suggestion as National Rahmatul-lil-Alameen Wa Khatam an-Nabiyyin Authority formerly National Rahmatul-lil-Alameen Authority.

The authority will conduct research on the prophetic biography and hadith to build the character of the youth. In addition, the authority will consult with relevant experts to make the biography of Muhammad a part of the academic curriculum. It will also be tasked with explaining Islam to the world.

The Authority
According to the ordinance issued by the President of Pakistan Arif Alvi, the National Rahmatul Lil Aalameen Authority will consist of a chairman and six members. The chairman of the authority will be appointed by the Prime Minister  of Pakistan, who will also be its Patron-in-Chief. The advisory board of the committee will meet at least once a quarter.

Authority will take steps for justice and welfare state. The authority will conduct research on the prophetic biography and hadiths to build the character of the youth. In addition, the authority will consult with relevant experts to make the biography of Muhammad a part of the curriculum. It will also be tasked with explaining Islam to the world. Its formation was announced while the Prime Minister of Pakistan, Imran Khan, was addressing the Ashra-e-Rehmat-ul-Lil-Aalamin conference in Islamabad. The ordinance to set up the authority was promulgated by President Arif Alvi on 14 October 2021.

Patron-in-Chief
Prime Minister of Pakistan

Chairman
 Anis Ahmad (March 1- present) 
 Ejaz Akram (7 December 2021 - February 18, 2022)

Members of the Advisory Committee
 advisory Board list
Hamza Yusuf
Seyyed Hossein Nasr
Mohammad Faghfoory
Joseph E. B. Lumbard
Waleed El-Ansary
Anis Ahmad
Attaur Rehman 
Barrister Nusret Majid
Dr Basit Koshul
Sahibzada Sajid Rehman

Members of the National Rahmatul-lil-Alameen Authority
 Members list

Criticism and Controversies 
According to Umair Javed, the purported purpose of the new authority is to get Pakistan  out  of a selectively portrayed cultural breakdown and moral crisis afflicting all aspects of social life. Javed says Pakistan is far from drifting and is going through regressive conservative revivalism in television segments of religious televangelism to television drama. Javed says that for decades, Pakistan has been in the midst of a large-scale Barelvi and Deobandi revival, with much more violence around the blasphemy law, and associated suppression of minority rights; Quranic study circles and spiritual movements like as Dawat-i-Islami, Tablighi Jamaat and Al Huda are proliferating among the middle class and  associated consumption of religious commodities is increasing.

According to Zahid Hussain the new authority established through ordinance by former Prime Minister Imran Khan is an extension of Gen Zia's legacy of deploying religiosity to achieve political gains, with the cover of resetting the system in the name of Islamic faith, the moves are to undermine the freedoms of expression, democratic processes in the country and encourage authoritarianism.

According to the Friday Times, the appointed founder Chairman Ejaz Akram held and promoted controversial views against ethnic civil rights groups like the Pashtun Tahafuz Movement (PTM)  and that Akram was critical of the concept of democracy.  Hussain says Akram  advocates conspiracy theories (espousing that 9/11 was a false flag operation by the US), advocates regional expansionism by Pakistan and his concept of rule by elites of elites fascist. Friday Times says Akram subscribes to conspiracy theories to downplay the COVID-19 pandemic. Akram has written that "Belief in deep secularism, the idea of a republic, nationalism, capitalism, feminism, absolute freedom of speech, are all false consciousness that must be abandoned for things that work for us".

Zahid Hussain says Imran Khan's PTI government has already caused huge damage to education in Pakistan by introducing the Single National Curriculum which would reinforce a closed mindset and additional measures to 'Islamise' the system, which will lead to a further decline in educational standards.

Due to the controversies surrounding the founder Chairman he resigned two months into his formal tenure.  In his place, a respected academic, Anis Ahmad (Ph.D. Temple University, USA)  currently Vice Chancellor of the private Riphah University and formerly a Vice President of the International Islamic University Islamabad, was appointed as Chairman.

See also 

 Council of Islamic Ideology

References

2021 establishments in Pakistan
Government agencies established in 2021
Pakistan federal departments and agencies